The following is a list of current and historical women's universities and colleges in Japan. A women's college is an institution of higher education where enrollment is all-female. Most of these are private universities; a few are funded by the prefectural governments; the only two funded by the national government are Nara and Ochanomizu.

Where institutions have become coeducational, this is noted, along with the year the enrollment policy was changed.  Current (as of 2007) women's colleges are listed in bold text.  Colleges that are closing or transitioning to coeducation are listed in italics.

Aichi
Aichi Prefectural University, Nagakute (co-ed since 1966)
Aichi Gakusen University, Okazaki (co-ed since 1987)
Chukyo Women's University, Obu (co-ed since 1998)
Kinjo Gakuin University, Nagoya
Nagoya Women's University, Nagoya
Ohkagakuen University, Toyota
Sugiyama Jogakuen University, Nagoya

Ehime
Matsuyama Shinonome College, Matsuyama

Fukushima
Koriyama Women's University Koriyama, Fukushima

Fukuoka
Chikushi Jogakuen University, Dazaifu
Fukuoka Jo Gakuin University, Fukuoka
Fukuoka Women's University, Fukuoka
Kyushu Women's University, Kitakyushu
Seinan Jo Gakuin University, Kitakyushu

Gifu
Gifu Women's University, Gifu
Tokai Women's University, Kakamigahara

Gunma
Gunma Prefectural Women's University, Tamamura

Hiroshima
Hiroshima Bunkyo Women's University, Asaminami
Hiroshima Jogakuin University, Asakita
Hiroshima Campus, Prefectural University of Hiroshima, Minami (co-ed since 1994)
Yasuda Women's University, Asaminami
Kure University, Kure

Hyōgo
Kobe College, Nishinomiya
Kobe Kaisei College, Nada-ku
Kobe Shinwa Women's University, Kita-ku
Kobe Shoin Women's University, Nada-ku
Kobe Pharmaceutical University, Higashinada (co-ed since 1994)
Kobe Women's University, Suma
Kobe Yamate University, Chūō-ku (co-ed since 2001)
Konan Women's University, Higashinada
Mukogawa Women's University, Nishinomiya
Otemae University, Nishinomiya (co-ed since 2000)
Seiwa College, Nishinomiya (co-ed since 1981)
Sonoda Gakuen Women's University, Amagasaki

Kagoshima
Kagoshima Immaculate Heart University, Kagoshima

Kanagawa
 Caritas Junior College, Aoba-ku, Yokohama
 Ferris University, Izumi-ku, Yokohama
 Kamakura Women's University, Kamakura
 Odawara Women's Junior College, Odawara
 Toyo Eiwa University, Midori-ku, Yokohama
 Sagami Women's University, Sagamihara
 Shoin University, Atsugi (co-ed since 2004)
 St. Cecilia Women's Junior College, Yamato

Kōchi
Kochi Women's University, Kōchi (co-ed since April 2011)

Kumamoto
Kumamoto Prefectural University, Kumamoto (co-ed since 1994)

Kyoto
Doshisha Women's College of Liberal Arts, Kyōtanabe
Kyoto Koka Women's University, Ukyō
Kyoto Notre Dame University, Sakyō
Kyoto Tachibana University, Yamashina (co-ed since 2005)
Kyoto Women's University, Higashiyama
Kacho College, Higashiyama

Nagano
Nagano Prefectural College, Nagano (co-ed since 2004)
Seisen Jogakuin College, Nagano

Nagasaki
Kwassui Women's College, Nagasaki

Nara
Nara Women's University, Nara
Tezukayama University, Nara (co-ed since 1987)

Okayama
Mimasaka University, Tsuyama (co-ed since 2003)
Nortre Dame Seishin University, Okayama
Shujitsu University, Okayama (co-ed since 2003)

Osaka
Baika Women University, Ibaraki
Heian Jogakuin (St. Agnes') University
Kansai Medical University, Moriguchi (co-ed since 1954)
Moriguchi Campus of Osaka International University, Moriguchi (co-ed since 2002)
Osaka Jogakuin College, Osaka
Daisen Campus, Osaka Prefecture University, Sakai (co-ed since 2005)
Osaka Shoin Women's University, Higashiosaka
Osaka Ohtani University, Tondabayashi (co-ed since 2006)
Senri Kinran University, Suita
Shitennoji International Buddhist University, Habikino (co-ed since 1981)
Soai University, Osaka (co-ed since 1982)
Tezukayama Gakuin University, Sakai (co-ed since 2003)

Saitama
 Rissho Women's University (now Bunkyo University), Koshigaya (co-ed since 1976)

Tokushima
Shikoku University, Tokushima (co-ed since 1992)

Tokyo
Keisen University, Tama
Japan Women's University, Bunkyō Ward
Ochanomizu Women's University, Bunkyō
Showa Women's University, Setagaya
Tokyo Kasei University, Itabashi
Tokyo Kasei-Gakuin University , Chiyoda
 Tokyo Kaseigakuin—Tsukuba Women's University (now Tsukuba Gakuin University), Tsukuba (co-ed since 2005)
Tokyo Woman's Christian University, Suginami
Tokyo Women's Medical University, Shinjuku
Tsuda College, Kodaira

Yamaguchi
Baiko Gakuin University, Shimonoseki (co-ed since 2001)
Yamaguchi Prefectural University, Yamaguchi (co-ed since 1996)

See also
List of universities in Japan

 
women's